Nav Sidhu is a British television, theatre, and film actor. His longest-running television role was as Azim Desai in the Channel 4/E4 soap opera Hollyoaks.

Career

Film

Television

Theatre

References

External links 

 
 
 Nav Sidhu professional  profile at Waring & McKenna

British male film actors
British male television actors
British male stage actors
Year of birth missing (living people)
Living people
British male actors of Indian descent